The men's 3 metre springboard, also known as the fancy diving competition, was one of two diving events on the Diving at the 1908 Summer Olympics programme, along with the men's 10 metre platform. The competition was held on Tuesday 14 and Saturday 18 July 1908. Twenty-three divers from eight nations competed. Each nation could enter up to 12 divers.

Competition format

The competition was actually held from both 3 metre and 1 metre boards. Divers performed a running plain dive and a running forward somersault from the 1 metre board, a one-and-a-half somersault and a backward spring and forward dive from the 3 metre board, and three (different) dives of the competitor's choice from the 3 metre board. The voluntary dives were selected from a list of 20 options, most of which could be done from either a standing or running start.

Each judge gave a score between 0 and 10 points, in increments of half a point, for each dive. Points were then added to voluntary dives based on degree of difficulty (difficulty points ranged from 1 to 10 per dive). No difficulty points were awarded for the compulsory dives. The dive scores from each judge were summed and divided by 3, with the three judges' results added to give a final score. However, the final scores were not technically determinative (except as tie-breakers); after the scores were calculated, each judge ranked the competitors (and could choose to follow the scores or not) and the competition was decided on a point-for-place system with the competitor with the lowest total ranking from the three judges winning. Final scores were used as tie-breakers if this aggregate ranking was tied. In no case was the point-for-place result different for any round from the final scores, however, and ties in final scores led to an extra diver advancing to the semifinals as well as two bronze medals being awarded; the Official Report contains only the final scores and not the ordinal rankings from the judges. Indeed, it appears that "the ordinal scores are not recorded in any source" and "the individual judges' scores are not known, so it is not possible to reconstruct the ordinal placements."

The competition was held over three rounds (first round, semifinals, and final). The first round consisted of 5 groups of between 3 and 6 divers each; the top 2 divers in each group advanced to the semifinals. The semifinals consisted of 2 groups, one of 5 divers and one of 6 divers (due to a tie in the first round resulting in an additional diver advancing). The top 2 divers in each group advanced to the final. The final featured 4 divers.

Results

First round

The two divers who scored the greatest number of points in each group of the first round advanced to the semifinals.  A tie in the third group for second place resulted in both divers joining the group winner in advancing, for a total of 11 divers in the semifinals.

Group 1

Group 2

Group 3

Group 4

Group 5

Semifinals

The two divers from each semifinal with the highest scores advanced to the final.

Semifinal 1

Semifinal 2

Final

A tie for third place resulted in both divers receiving bronze medals.

References

Sources
 
 

Men
1908